CFAV Glenside (YTB 644) is a Glen class naval tugboat operated by the Royal Canadian Navy. Built at Georgetown Shipyard, Georgetown, Prince Edward Island, and launched in 1977, the ship was delivered on 20 May 1977. Attached to Maritime Forces Atlantic, the ship is based at CFB Halifax.

References

Fleet of the Royal Canadian Navy
1977 ships
Glen-class tugs (1975)
Auxiliary ships of the Royal Canadian Navy